Dorjgotovyn Pürevloov (born 12 October 1944) is a Mongolian cross-country skier. She competed in two events at the 1964 Winter Olympics. She was the first woman to represent Mongolia at the Olympics.

References

External links
 

1944 births
Living people
Mongolian female cross-country skiers
Olympic cross-country skiers of Mongolia
Cross-country skiers at the 1964 Winter Olympics
Place of birth missing (living people)
20th-century Mongolian women